Club Deportivo Marathón is a Honduran professional football club based in San Pedro Sula. Founded on 25 November 1925, Marathón currently plays in the Liga Nacional de Fútbol Profesional de Honduras.

History

Club Deportivo Marathón was founded on 25 November 1925 in San Pedro Sula by Eloy Montes and a group of his friends. Ever since, Marathón has become one of the most prestigious clubs in Honduras, winning multiple titles. Club Deportivo Marathón has its own sporting venue that has different fields for the first team all the way to the lower youth levels, and even a tennis cement based foosball lit for night games. The venue has since improved through the years by the support of Friends of the Marathón Group (GAMA) and the different boards of directors through the years.

First title (1979)
The club would win its first title in 1979, under the orders of Ángel Ramón Rodríguez. With figures like Roberto Bailey, Arturo Bonilla, Francisco Javier Toledo, Celso Güity, Efraín Osorio, Ramón Osorio, René Suazo, Jorge Alberto Bueso, Félix Carranza, Jorge Phoyoú, Alberto Merelles, and Juan Carlos Wéber among others, the club remained in first place in the regular season standings. Having secured their classification to the final, El Monstruo Verde defeated Pumas UNAH 2–0 over two legs.

Second title (1985)
It took six years for Marathón to win another championship. This was achieved in 1985. At that time, Gonzalo Zelaya of La Ceiba was the team coach. In the regular season, Marathón was second in their group behind C.D. Olimpia on goal difference. In the final round, Marathón was the champion with 4 wins, 1 draw and only 1 loss to rivals: Vida, Motagua and Olimpia. In the deciding match in San Pedro Sula at the Estadio Francisco Morazán, Marathón faced off with Vida. With a goal from Roy Padilla Bardales, the emerald outfit won 1–0 and was crowned league champion for the second time.

Third title (2002)

Marathón had a drought of nearly 17 years without a league title. However, at the beginning of the new century, the club began having a resurgence. This is due to that, in 2001, the Honduran coach Chelato Uclés, began a major renovation project. Forming a team without many big name players, Uclés led Marathón to the top once again, establishing El Monstruo Verde as one of the strongest teams in the league. Uclés led the team went to the Apertura final, losing against Motagua on penalties (5–3). However, the great work of Marathón was applauded and recognized by several journalists, hobbyists and technicians in the country for their offensive and attractive football. In the Clausura season, Marathón finished third in the regular season with 29 points, and faced Platense in the semifinals. In the first leg, Marathón won 2–1 in San Pedro Sula, with a brace from Enrique Reneau, while Platense pulled one back with a goal from Clifford Laing. In the second leg, Marathón drew 0–0 at Puerto Cortés and qualified for the final. Marathón faced Olimpia in the final, who defeated Victoria 3–2 on aggregate in the semifinals. In the first leg played at the Estadio Olímpico Metropolitano, Marathón defeated Olimpia 4–1 with a penalty from Nigel Zúniga, and goals from Enrique Reneau and Óscar Vargas. In the second leg at Estadio Tiburcio Carías Andino, Olimpia won 1–0, but it wasn't enough as Marathón won 4–2 on aggregate and secured a third league title.

Fourth title (2003)
Just after 13 months, Marathón would again win another title. In the Clausura tournament, the Esmeraldas were directed by the Brazilian Flavio Ortega. Ortega replaced the Argentine Miguel Angel Lemme, who left in the middle of the season. Flavio Ortega lifted the team to finally reach second place in the regular season (only surpassed by Olimpia). In the semi-finals, Marathón faced Real España. In the first leg both teams tied 1–1; Henry Jimenez scored first for Real España, but Pompilio Cacho drew level. Three days later in the return game, played at the Estadio Olímpico Metropolitano, both sides drew 1–1 once again. Marathón entered the final, having finished higher in the regular season standings. Marathón faced Motagua in the final, with The Motagüenses having eliminated Olimpia in the semifinals. The first leg of the final was played at the Estadio Tiburcio Carías Andino, and Marathón surprised to win 1–0 with a goal from Emil Martínez, who was later sent off. In the return leg, Marathón had a total number of 35,000 fans at the Olímpico Metropolitano, the second highest attendance record in the history of Liga Nacional. Motagua struck first with a goal from Luis Oseguera in the 39th minute, however Pompilio Cacho scored the equalizer at the end of the first half. In the second half, Marathón were up 2 by goals, both scored by Denilson Costa. With this, Marathón were champions for a fourth time.

Fifth title (2004)
The team won its fifth title in 2004. Former player Nicolás Suazo led Marathón against Olimpia. After winning the first game in San Pedro Sula, Marathón won the tie in extra-time thanks to two goals from Edgardo Simovic.

Sixth title (2007)
On 22 December 2007, Marathón won its sixth league title. Under the guidance of Manuel Keosseián, the club beat Motagua in San Pedro Sula by 2–0 score after a 0–0 draw on the first leg in Tegucigalpa. Mitchel Brown and Erick Scott scored the winning goals.

Seventh title (2008)
On 13 December 2008, Marathón won its seventh title in its history and the fifth one of the new century. With Keosseián again as the coach, the club beat Real España at the Estadio Olímpico Metropolitano by a 1–0 scoreline in the first leg. In the second leg, both teams finished in a 1–1 draw.

Eighth title (2009)
In the 2009–10 season, Marathón faced Olimpia in the Apertura final. Having lost 1–0 in the first leg in Tegucigalpa, Los Panzas Verdes won 2–0 in the second leg with goals from Guillermo Ramírez and Jerry Palacios.

Ninth title (2018)
On 19 May 2018, Marathón was crowded a ninth time. Marathón faced Motagua and having finished 1–1 over two legs, Marathón came out victorious 5–4 on penalties. Under the guidance of the coach Hector Vargas, the club maintained their composure during the entire season.

Stadium
Marathón plays its home games in Estadio Yankel Rosenthal, which is located in San Pedro Sula. Marathón is the only team in Honduras to have its own stadium. Yankel Rosenthal is a multi-purpose stadium located in Colonia La Sabana in San Pedro Sula, Honduras has a capacity of 7,000 fans. The project, which was scheduled to be completed in full for 2007, was postponed to 2009 due to financial problems.

Club rivalries

Clásico Nacional

El Clásico Nacional (The National Classic) is a Honduran national football derby played between C.D. Olimpia and Marathón, with the former being from Tegucigalpa, and the latter from San Pedro Sula. The rivalry began in September 1928, when Olimpia, at that time Central Zone champion, won its three match final series against Marathón, champion of the North. This event created the National Classic.

Clásico de las M's
El Clásico de las M's (The Classic of the M's) or El Derbi de las M's  (The "M" Derby), is a derby football match played between F.C. Motagua from Tegucigalpa and Marathón, two of the most successful and popular football teams in Honduras.

Clásico Sampedrano

El Clásico Sampedrano (The Sampedran Derby) is contested between Marathón and Real C.D. España. These two teams are from San Pedro Sula, hence the name.

Support
Marathón is one of the big four teams in la Liga Nacional de Fútbol Profesional de Honduras, being the second team to Honduras in terms of number of fans, being beaten only by Olimpia.

IFFHS club ranking
In 2009, Marathón was positioned at 234 in the International Federation of Football History & Statistics Club World Ranking, the highest a Honduran club had ever been at the time. As of 31 December 2020, Marathón is ranked at 384 out of 400, sitting behind Shanghai Shenhua F.C. of the Chinese Super League.

Achievements
Domestic
Liga Nacional de Fútbol Profesional de Honduras: 9
1979–80, 1985–86, Clausura 2002, Clausura 2003, Apertura 2004, Apertura 2007, Apertura 2008, Apertura 2009, Clausura 2018
Runners-up (12): 1966–67, 1967–68, 1973–74, 1980–81, 1987–88, Apertura 2001, Clausura 2004, Clausura 2005, Apertura 2005, Clausura 2007, Clausura 2008, Clausura 2012.

Honduran Cup: 2
1994, 2017
Runners-up: 1972

Honduran Supercup: 1
2019
Runners-up: 2017

International
CONCACAF Cup Winners Cup
Third-place: 1995

League and playoffs performance
(1994–present)

Other facts
 Marathón was the first team in Honduras to beat a Mexican club in an official match. In 1981, Marathón beat Cruz Azul at the Estadio Azteca 3–1, in the process becoming the first Honduran team to beat a Mexican club on home turf.
 The first game that Marathón held against South American opposition was in 1968, against Cúcuta Deportivo of Colombia. Marathón won 3–0 in the Estadio Morazán. The last match Marathón had against a South American team was in 2002, when the Verdolagas defeated Argentinian powerhouse River Plate 3–1 at the Estadio Olímpico Metropolitano.
 Their first game against a Mexican team was in 1967, when they won over C.D. Irapuato 6–3 at the Francisco Morazán Stadium.
 Marathón held a game against Brazilian club Santos in 1969 which was tied 1-1. Pelé was subbed on in the second-half.
 Marathón in the 1960s and 1970s was known as the "foreign team executioner". This was because at this time, Honduran teams were often swept by foreigners, unlike Marathón and Olimpia. The most significant triumphs at the time were: In 1966 the thrashing of Deportivo Saprissa of Costa Rica 4–0 at the Francisco Morazán, a victory over Pachuca of Mexico 2–1 in 1967, also at the Francisco Morazán, and a victory against Peruvian side Sporting Cristal 2–1 in 1971.
 The club's top scorer is Gilberto Leonel Machado with 78 goals.
 Marathón's largest ever league win was in 1976 when they defeated Campamento 7–0.
 Marathón's largest ever defeat was at the hands of Mexican club Toluca in 2009 when they lost 7–0 in CONCACAF Champions League at the Estadio Nemesio Díez.

League and performance

All-time table
(From 1965 to 1966 to 2009–10)

International competition

CONCACAF Champions' Cup and Champions League
1974 CONCACAF Champions' Cup
First Round v.  C.S.D. Municipal – 0:1, 0:3 (Municipal advanced 4:0 on aggregate)
1980 CONCACAF Champions' Cup
First Round v.  C.S. Herediano – 3:0, 1:3 (Marathón advanced 4:3 on aggregate)
First Round v.  Comunicaciones F.C. – 1:1, 4:0 (Marathón advanced 5:1 on aggregate but withdrew after series)
1981 CONCACAF Champions' Cup
First Round v.  C.D. Santiagueño – 4:0, 1:1 (Marathón advanced 5:1 on aggregate)
Second Round v.  Cruz Azul – 3:1, 1:1 (Marathón advanced 4:1 on aggregate)
Third Round v.  C.D. Atlético Marte – (Marathón withdrew)
1986 CONCACAF Champions' Cup
First Round v.  Alianza F.C. – 0:1, 3:2 (Alianza advanced 4:2 on penalties)
1988 CONCACAF Champions' Cup
Group C v.  C.S.D. Municipal – 2:0
Group C v.  C.D. Águila – 1:0
Group C v.  Alajuelense – 0:1
Third Round v.  Alajuelense – 0:2
Third Round v.  Aurora F.C. – 2:1
Third Round v.  C.D. Olimpia – 1:2
2008–09 CONCACAF Champions League
Preliminary round v.  A.D. Isidro Metapán – 2:2, 1:2 (Marathón advanced 4:3 on aggregate)
Group A v.  Cruz Azul – 2:0, 1:1
Group A v.  D.C. United – 2:0, 2:4
Group A v.  Saprissa – 2:1, 2:0
Quarterfinals v.  Puerto Rico Islanders – 2:1, 1:0 (Islanders advanced 3:1 on aggregate)
2009–10 CONCACAF Champions League
Group B v.  D.C. United – 3:1, 3:0
Group B v.  San Juan Jabloteh F.C. – 3:1, 2:4
Group B v.  Deportivo Toluca F.C. – 0:7, 2:0
Quarterfinals v.  UNAM – 2:0, 1:6 (UNAM advanced 6:3 on aggregate)
2010–11 CONCACAF Champions League
Group C v.  Seattle Sounders FC – 2:1, 2:0
Group C v.  Saprissa – 4:1, 2:1
Group C v.  C.F. Monterrey – 2:0, 0:1
2012–13 CONCACAF Champions League
Group 4 v.  Caledonia AIA – 0:0, 2:1
Group 4 v.  Seattle Sounders FC – 2:3, 3:1
2019 CONCACAF Champions League
Round of 16 v.  Santos Laguna – 2:6, 5:0 (Santos advanced 11:2 on aggregate)
2021 CONCACAF Champions League
Round of 16 v.  Portland Timbers – 2:2, 0:5 (Portland advanced 7:2 on aggregate)

CONCACAF League
2019 CONCACAF League
Preliminary round v.  Comunicaciones F.C. – 2:1, 1:1 (Comunicaciones advanced 3:2 on aggregate)
2020 CONCACAF League
Round of 16 v.  Antigua GFC – 1:1 (Marathón advanced after winning 4:3 on penalties)
Quarter-finals v.  Saprissa – 0:2 (Saprissa advanced)
Play-in round v.  Forge FC – 1:0 (Marathón qualified for 2021 CONCACAF Champions League)

Torneo Fraternidad
1980 Torneo Fraternidad
First Round v.  C.D. FAS – 1:2, 0:8 (FAS advanced 10:1 on aggregate)
1981 Torneo Fraternidad
First Round v.  C.D. Águila – 2:1, 5:0 (Marathón advanced 7:1 on aggregate)
1982 Torneo Fraternidad
First Round v.  Club Xelajú MC – 0:2, 1:1 (Xelajú MC advanced 3:1 on aggregate)

Copa Interclubes UNCAF
2002 UNCAF Interclub Cup
Group C v.  Alajuelense – 1:2
Group C v.  F.C. Motagua – 1:2
Group C v.  Tauro F.C. – 4:0
2003 UNCAF Interclub Cup
Group 3 v.  San Francisco F.C. – 5:0
Group 3 v.  C.D. Olimpia – 0:0
Group 3 v.  Alajuelense – 0:0
2005 UNCAF Interclub Cup
First Round v.  Parmalat FC – 3:0 (Parmalat withdrew)
Quarter-finals v.  Deportivo Saprissa – 0:4, 4:0 (Saprissa advanced 5:4 on penalties)
2006 UNCAF Interclub Cup
First Round v.  C.D. Águila – 2:0, 1:1 (Marathón advanced 3:1 on aggregate)
Quarter-finals v.  Deportivo Marquense – 1:1, 0:1 (Marquense advanced 2:1 on aggregate)

Current squad

Reserve team

Player records

Most goals
(As of 21 October 2019)
Bold players are still active

Most appearances
(As of 20 April 2013)

Marathón's logos
Since 1925, Marathón has used the same logo composed of green, white, and red.

Uniforms
Along with the crest colors of green, white, and red, Marathón has recently worn black. The team uniform has been manufactured by Joma.

Kit evolution

Former coaches

 Omar Muraco
 Aranghel Gigov
 Jaime Ramírez
 José Raúl Ortiz
 Zubiaga
 Eduardo Piña Monzálves (1965–66)
 Héctor Mejía (1966–67)
 Enrique Grey (1973)
 Ramón Rodríguez (1979)
 José Luis Mattera (1980)
 Amilcar Medrano (1982)
 Gonzalo Zelaya (1985)
 José de la Paz Herrera (1987)
 Néstor Matamala (1988–89)
 Luis Cubillas (1991–92)
 Alberto Chedrani (1992)
 Ramón Maradiaga (1993)
 Carlos Padilla (1996–97)
 Edwin Pavón (1998)
 Horacio Adinolfi (1999–00)
 José de la Paz Herrera (2001–02)
 Rubén Guifarro (2002)
 Gilberto Machado (2002)
 Miguel Angel Lemme (2003)
  Flavio Ortega (2003)
 Alfonso Rendón (2003–04)
 Nicolás Suazo (2004–05)
 Jairo Ríos (2005)
 Juan de Dios Castillo (2005–06)
 Gilberto Yearwood (2006)
  Manuel Keosseian (2006), (2007)
 Jorge Pineda (2007)
 José de la Paz Herrera (2008), (2011)
  Manuel Keosseian (15 June 2008 – 26 Jan 2010)
 Nicolás Suazo (28 Jan 2010 – 8 Sept 2010)
 Edwin Pavón (8 Sept 2010 – 31 Dec 2010)
  Manuel Keosseian (28 May 2011–11)
 Ramón Maradiaga (2012)
  Manuel Keosseian (2012 – 29 Nov 2012)
 Carlos Martínez (4 Dec 2012–1?)
  Manuel Keosseian (1 Jan 2014 – June 2014)
 Héctor Castellón (June 2014 – Jan 2015)
 Jairo Rios (Feb 2015 – Feb 2016)
 Carlos Pavón (Feb 2016 – Nov 2016)
  Manuel Keosseian (Jan 2017 – May 2017)
 Héctor Vargas (June 2017 – July 2021)
 Martín García (July 2021–)

References

External links

Official fan website

 
Association football clubs established in 1925
Football clubs in Honduras
1925 establishments in Honduras